The 2020 NCAA Division III Men's Ice Hockey Tournament was a postseason tournament scheduled for the culmination of the 2019–20 season, the 37th such tournament in NCAA history. It was scheduled to conclude on March 28 at the LECOM Harborcenter in Buffalo, New York. On March 12, the NCAA announced that the tournament was cancelled due to the coronavirus pandemic.

Qualifying teams
Twelve teams qualified for the tournament in the following ways: (Pool A) eight teams will receive bids as a result of being conference tournament champions from conferences that possessed an automatic bid, (Pool C) four additional teams will receive at-large bids based upon their records.

Format
The tournament was to feature four rounds of play. All rounds would have been Single-game elimination.

The top four overall seeds, with at least one coming from each region, received automatic bids into the quarterfinal round and were arranged so that if all were to reach the semifinals, the top seed would play the fourth seed while the second seed would play the third seed.

The two lowest seeded western teams were placed in the first round of the same quarterfinal bracket with the winner advancing to play the top western seed. The remaining western seed was set against the top eastern team in the first round with the winner advancing to play the third eastern seed.

The remaining eastern teams were arranged so that the fifth- and eighth-seeded teams would play with the winner advancing to play the second eastern seed while the sixth- and seventh-seeded teams would play with the winner advancing to play the top eastern seed.

In the First Round and Quarterfinals the higher-seeded team served as host.

Tournament Bracket

Note: * denotes overtime period(s)

References

External links
Division III Men's Ice Hockey Record Book

 
NCAA Division III ice hockey
NCAA Division III Men's Ice Hockey Tournament